The Love Nest is a 1922 German silent film directed by Rudolf Walther-Fein and starring Paul Wegener, Reinhold Schünzel, and Lyda Salmonova. It was released in two parts.

The film's sets were designed by the art director Rochus Gliese.

Cast
 Reinhold Schünzel as Lothar von Brandt
 Paul Wegener
 Lyda Salmonova
 Hans Adalbert Schlettow
 Olga Limburg
 Käthe Haack
 Erich Kaiser-Titz
 Wilhelm Diegelmann
 Margit Barnay
 Hugo Flink
 Max Gülstorff
 Hermann Picha
 Hermine Sterler

References

Bibliography

External links

1922 films
Films of the Weimar Republic
German silent feature films
Films directed by Rudolf Walther-Fein
German black-and-white films
1920s German films